Constructive Approximation is "an international mathematics journal dedicated to Approximations, expansions, and related research in: computation, function theory, functional analysis, interpolation spaces and interpolation of operators, numerical analysis, space of functions, special functions, and applications."

References

External links 
 Constructive Approximation web site

Mathematics journals
Approximation theory
English-language journals
Publications established in 1985
Springer Science+Business Media academic journals
Bimonthly journals